The Association for Experiential Education, or AEE, is a nonprofit, professional membership association that promotes experiential education. Currently based in St. Petersburg, Florida, USA, it was founded in the early 1970s in Boone, North Carolina by a group of educators who believed that the core of learning is enhanced by experiential forms of education.

Membership
AEE members have affiliations in education, recreation, outdoor and adventure programming, the environment, mental health, youth development, programming for people with disabilities, service learning, and organizational development.  Professionals, organizations, and students who share the mission and vision of AEE join to benefit from and contribute to the network of resources championing experiential education.  This includes the publication of an academic journal, as well as regional and international conferences.

Publications
The association publishes the Journal of Experiential Education in collaboration with SAGE Publications.

Conferences
AEE hosts eight regional conferences and one international conference annually, which jointly serve more than 1,800 attendees with hundreds of workshops, prominent speakers, continuing education units, regional and networking opportunities, and entertainment.  Educators, practitioners and students from around the world come together at these events with the goal of developing professionally, and promoting, defining, and applying the theories and practices of experiential education.

Accreditation
After a rapid increase in the number of adventure programs in the late 1980s and early 1990s, the need for standards of program quality, professional behavior, and appropriate risk management became imperative. In 1994, AEE responded to that need by developing the most comprehensive standards for common practices in the adventure education industry, becoming the nation's first recognized accreditation process focusing on adventure education programming. Since then, the AEE Accreditation Program's standards-based evaluation process by objective, independent reviewers has become the industry-accepted level of professional evaluation for adventure programs. AEE recently added an accreditation program focusing on Outdoor Behavioral Healthcare.

Awards
Among other awards, AEE has presented the Karl Rohnke Creativity Award since 1997.

Past recipients
 1997 – Sandy Carlson
 1998 – Mobile Team Challenge
 1999 – Jim Cain
 2000 – Sam Sikes
 2001 – Rufus Collinson
 2003 – Thomas A. Shearer
 2005 – Tom Smith
 2006 – Clifford Knapp
 2007 – TA Loeffler
 2008 – Chris Cavert
 2009 – Brent Bell
 2010 – Kim Wasserburger
 2011 – Maurie Lung
 2012 – Marilyn Levin
 2014 – Madhu Sudan
 2015 – Gary Stauffer
 2016 – Amy Climer
 2017 – Michelle Cummings
 2018 – Jude Hirsch
 2019 – Seth C. Hawkins

[No award given in 2002, 2004, and 2013]

See also
 Adventure education
 Adventure therapy
 Experiential education
 Outdoor education

References

External links
 Association for Experiential Education
 Association for Experiential Education Accreditation Program
 The Challenge - a social networking community for adventure-based experiential learning practitioners.

Non-profit organizations based in Colorado
Outdoor education organizations
Educational organizations based in the United States